Eugene O. "Choo-Choo" Roberts (January 20, 1923 – July 6, 2009) was an American football halfback for the New York Giants of the National Football League (NFL) from 1947 to 1950.  Roberts played college football at Chattanooga, leading the NCAA in scoring in 1946 with 117 points. He set the NFL and the New York Giants single game rushing record with 218 yards on November 12, 1950 against the Chicago Cardinals.  The NFL record was broken by Thomas Wilson of the Los Angeles Rams on December 16, 1956.  The Giants single game rushing record stood for over 55 years, until it was broken by Tiki Barber on December 17, 2005.

Roberts left the Giants in 1950 and played in the Canadian Football League for the Montreal Alouettes in 1951 and the Ottawa Rough Riders from 1952 to 1954. 

Roberts is the only person to lead the NCAA, the NFL (102 points in 1949) and the CFL (88 points in 1953) in scoring.

See also
 List of NCAA major college football yearly scoring leaders

References

External links
 Mocs Legend Gene Roberts Passes
 Obituary from the July 7, 2009 Kansas City Star

1923 births
2009 deaths
American football running backs
American players of Canadian football
Chattanooga Mocs football players
New York Giants players
Montreal Alouettes players
Ottawa Rough Riders players
Eastern Conference Pro Bowl players
Sportspeople from Independence, Missouri
Players of American football from Kansas City, Missouri
Players of Canadian football from Kansas City, Missouri